This page covers all the important events in the sport of tennis in 1994. Primarily, it provides the results of notable tournaments throughout the year on both the ATP and WTA Tours, the Davis Cup, and the Fed Cup.

ITF

Grand Slam events

Australian Open

The 1994 Australian Open was the first major tournament of the year. It took place at Flinders Park in Melbourne, Australia, from 17 to 30 January.

French Open

The 1994 French Open played on clay courts took place at the clay courts of the Stade Roland Garros in Paris, France from 23 May until 5 June.

Wimbledon

The 1994 Wimbledon Championships, played on grass courts, took place at the All England Lawn Tennis and Croquet Club in Wimbledon, London, England, and were held from 20 June to 3 July.

US Open

The 1994 US Open was the last major of the year, played on outdoor hard courts at the USTA National Tennis Center in New York City, United States. It was held from 29 August to 11 September.

Davis Cup

The 1994 Davis Cup was the 83rd edition of the year-long tournament between national teams in men's tennis.

Draw

Finals

Federation Cup

The 1994 Federation Cup was the 32nd edition of the most relevant competition between national teams in women's tennis.

Draw

Finals

ATP Tour

ATP Tour World Championships

The 1994 ATP Tour World Championships was the year-end tournament, where the best eight players of the year competed in a round robin format. The singles championship took place at the Frankfurt Festhalle in Frankfurt, Germany, and the doubles tournament was played in Jakarta, Indonesia.

Singles final
 Pete Sampras def.  Boris Becker, 4–6, 6–3, 7–5, 6–4

Doubles final
 Jan Apell /  Jonas Björkman def.  Todd Woodbridge /  Mark Woodforde 6–4, 4–6, 4–6, 7–6(7–5), 7–6(8–6).

Championship Series, Single Week events

The ATP Championship Series, Single Week events, precursors of the ATP Masters 1000, were the second in relevance after the Grand Slam tournaments.

WTA Tour

WTA Tour Championships

The 1994 WTA Tour Championships were held in New York, United States between November 14 and November 20. This was the year-end tournament, which was played by the top-eight women players.

Singles final
 Gabriela Sabatini def.  Lindsay Davenport, 6–3, 6–2, 6–4

Doubles final
 Gigi Fernández /  Natalia Zvereva def.  Jana Novotná /  Arantxa Sánchez Vicario, 6–3, 6–7, 6–3.

WTA Tier I Tournaments

The WTA Tier I Tournaments were next in importance to Grand Slam events.

Year-end singles rankings

International Tennis Hall of Fame
Class of 1994:
Hana Mandlíková, player
Bud Collins, contributor

See also
1994 ATP Tour
1994 WTA Tour

References

External links
Official website of the Association of Tennis Professionals (ATP)
Official website of the Women's Tennis Association (WTA)
Official website of the International Tennis Federation (ITF)

 
Tennis by year